Smulders is a Dutch occupational surname. It is a compression of "des mulders", meaning "the miller's son".  Notable people with this surname include:

Ans Smulders (born 1951), Dutch artistic gymnast
 (1863–1934), Dutch composer, pianist and novelist
Cobie Smulders (born 1982), Canadian actress
Henri Smulders (1863–1933), Dutch Olympic sailor
Karina Smulders (born 1980), Dutch actress
Laura Smulders (born 1993), Dutch bicycle motocross racer
Margriet Smulders (born 1955), Dutch photographer
Marlies Smulders (born 1982), Dutch rower
Truus Smulders-Beliën (1902–1966), Dutch politician and teacher
August - Frans Smulders (1838 - 1908), Shipbuilder

See also
Smolders

References 

Dutch-language surnames
Occupational surnames